Guus van Hecking Colenbrander  (7 November 1887 in Surabaya – 13 March 1945 in Zeist) was a Dutch football player. He played for the Netherlands national football team (1908).

References

1887 births
1945 deaths
Dutch footballers
Netherlands international footballers
Sportspeople from Surabaya
Association football defenders